Duvaucelia is a genus of sea slugs, nudibranchs, shell-less marine gastropod molluscs in the family Tritoniidae. It was synonymised with Tritonia until 2020 when a revision of the family Tritoniidae brought it back into use.

Species
Species within the genus Duvaucelia include:
 Duvaucelia lineata (Alder & Hancock, 1848)
 Duvaucelia manicata (Deshayes, 1853)
 Duvaucelia odhneri J. Tardy, 1963 (=Tritonia nilsodhneri Ev. Marcus, 1983
 Duvaucelia plebeia (G. Johnston, 1828)
 Duvaucelia striata (Haefelfinger, 1963)
 Duvaucelia taliartensis (Ortea & Moro, 2009)

References

Tritoniidae
Gastropod genera